The Popular Front for Democracy is a political party in Lesotho. 
At the elections for the National Assembly, 25 May 2002, the party won 1.1% of popular votes and 1 out of 120 seats. In the 17 February 2007 parliamentary election, the party kept 1 seat.
In 2012 elections it increases numbers of seats in the parliament, it got 3 seats. While in 2015 elections it got 2 seats, after 2017 elections it rise to 3 seats, although this was reduced to 1 in the 2022 elections.

Electoral Performance

References

Political parties in Lesotho